Microcolona polygethes is a moth in the family Elachistidae. It was described by Turner in 1939. It is found in Australia, where it has been recorded from Tasmania.

References

Moths described in 1939
Microcolona
Moths of Australia